Ruby City is a ghost town in Owyhee County, Idaho, United States. The town served as the original county seat of Owyhee County from 1863 to 1867. The growth of Silver City, which was founded a mile to the south in 1864, hastened Ruby City's demise. Today only remains of the cemetery mark the town's location.

References

Geography of Owyhee County, Idaho
Ghost towns in Idaho
Silver City Historic District (Idaho)
Populated places on the National Register of Historic Places in Idaho